Przytyk  is a village in Radom County, Masovian Voivodeship, in east-central Poland, founded in the year  1333. It is the seat of the gmina (administrative district) called Gmina Przytyk. In 2006 the village had a population of 990. For centuries Przytyk belonged to Sandomierz Voivodeship, and used to be a town from 1333 to 1869.

History
  

In the late Middle Ages, the area of Przytyk belonged to the Podlodowski family (Janina coat of arms), whose seat was located at a village of Zameczek (also called Ostrow). The town of Przytyk was founded in 1333 by Piotr Podlodowski (Piotr z Podlodowa). In 1488, due to efforts of Jan Podlodowski, the castellan of Zarnowiec, King Kazimierz Jagiellonczyk granted to Przytyk the privilege to hold two fairs a year, and markets on Mondays. The tradition of Monday markets survives until this day. In 1570 a wedding of one of the most famous  Polish poets, Jan Kochanowski, took place at Przytyk’s church. His wife was Dorota Podlodowska of Przytyk, and as a result of the marriage, the town became the property of the Kochanowski family. Przytyk remained in their hands until 1835, when the family lost it after the November Uprising. Like almost all towns of Lesser Poland, Przytyk was completely destroyed in the Swedish invasion of Poland (1655-1660).

Until the Partitions of Poland, Przytyk belonged to Lesser Poland's Sandomierz Voivodeship. The town took advantage of a convenient location, at the intersection of two important merchant routes - the so-called Royal Trail (Warsaw - Kraków), and the Greater Poland Trail (Lublin - Poznań). In 1834, the government of the Russian-controlled Congress Poland opened a new road from Warsaw towards Kraków via Radom, which bypassed Przytyk. In 1869, as a punishment for the January Uprising, Przytyk lost its town charter. In 1895, the village was completely destroyed by a fire, leaving 4,000 inhabitants homeless. The one building not destroyed was a church.

20th century

In the Second Polish Republic, following Poland's return to independence, Przytyk became an urban settlement in the Kielce Voivodeship with 2302 inhabitants in 1930, of whom 1852 (80 percent) were Jewish. The economy was almost entirely dominated by the Jewish craftsmen, tradesmen and farmers. The Jews owned and operated bakeries, slaughter houses, tailor shops, breweries, tobacco manufacturing plants, and groceries. Central markets were organized once a week, always on Mondays, drawing in crowds from nearby towns and villages. There was a power station in Przytyk, owned by Lejb Rozencwajg and two transportation companies, one owned by Pinkus Kornafel, and a second one owned by Moszek Rubinsztajn. There was also a Jewish-run credit union in the city. The competition for market share between Jews and a much smaller community of gentile Poles was intense, and the area was plagued by extreme poverty among both groups.

The town was the site of the 9 March 1936 Przytyk pogrom In spite of economic migration, prior to the invasion of Poland and the ensuing Holocaust, about 80 percent of the population remained Jewish. Most Jews of Przytyk were murdered in the Holocaust. In March 1941, Przytyk and the surrounding area was turned into a Luftwaffe training facility. All Polish residents were ordered to leave the town, and all buildings were destroyed by the Germans, except for the church. The destruction of the church was ordered on September 8, 1944, but this plan was halted due to lack of time. As a result, there are no historic buildings in Przytyk.

References

External links
 Jewish Community in Przytyk on Virtual Shtetl

Villages in Radom County
Holocaust locations in Poland
Historic Jewish communities in Poland